Oreoluwa Racheal Awolowo (born 2 March 1999) popularly known as Nora Awolowo is a Nigerian film director, cinematographer, documentary photographer, producer, and creative director. She was nominated for The Future Awards Africa in Prize for Film category.

Early life
Nora was born in Lagos, where she lived all her life and attended Primary and Secondary school, she studied Accounting at the Ekiti State University.

Career
Nora through her passion for directing learned through online tutorials (self-taught).
In 2019, her directed short documentary" Life at the Bay" was selected at the Africa International Film Festival.
She has produced, and directed films and documentaries such as Symphonies, Life at the Bay, David, Baby Blues and All Lives Matter.

Awards and nominations

References

External links
Nora Awolowo at FilmFreeway

Nigerian photographers
People from Lagos
Documentary film producers
Nigerian documentary filmmakers
Nigerian film directors
Nigerian film producers
1999 births
Living people
Nigerian cinematographers
Nigerian women film directors
Yoruba people
Nigerian women film producers
Ekiti State University alumni
Nigerian women photographers
Residents of Lagos